Kyron may refer to:

Kyron (given name)
SsangYong Kyron, a sport utility vehicle